Jan Martin Gismervik (born 1988 in Avaldsnes, Karmøy, Norway) is a Norwegian jazz musician (drums), known from bands like Monkey Plot, Torg, Oker, O, PGA.

Career 
Gismervik was raised in Avaldsnes, where he played in local groups. He is educated from the Improvised Music and Jazz Department at the Norwegian Academy of Music with a Bachelor Performance Degree, and in 2014 awarded "Young Jazz Musician of The Year" at Molde International Jazz Festival together with Monkey Plot. He cooperated within the duo "PGA" on the debut album Corrections (2012). On Corrections the "PGA" duo is assisted by Henrik Munkeby Nørstebø (trombone) and Torstein Lavik Larsen (trumpet) on two tracs. Monkey Plot, including Christian Skår Winther (guitar) and Magnus Skavhaug Nergaard (double bass), made their debut with the album Løv Og Lette Vimpler (2013).

Honors 
2014: Jazzintro award at Moldejazz, with Monkey Plot

Discography 
Within Wolfram
2012: Wolfram (Va Fongool)

Within PGA duo including Fredrik Luhr Dietrichson
2012: Corrections (Va Fongool)

Within Karokh
2014: Karokh (Loyal Label)
2016: Needle, Thread and Nailpolish (No Forevers)

Within Monkey Plot
2013: Løv Og Lette Vimpler (Gigafon)
2015: Angående Omstendigheter Som Ikke Lar Seg Nedtegne (Hubro Music)
2016: Here I Sit, Knowin All Of This (Hubro Music)
2016: Monkey Plot og Frode Gjerstad, FML Records (FML Records)

Within Platform
2015: Antroposcene (Va Fongool)
2017: FuxReFlux (Clean Feed)

Within Torg
2015: kost/elak/gneld (Jazzland)
2018: Palms, Beaches, Dreams (Earthly Habits)

Within Oker
2018: Husene Våre Er Museer (SOFA)

References

External links 
Jan Martin Gismervik at Rogalyd.no 

21st-century Norwegian drummers
Norwegian jazz drummers
Male drummers
Norwegian jazz composers
Musicians from Bergen
1988 births
Living people
Male jazz composers
21st-century Norwegian male musicians
Monkey Plot members